Brüggen may refer to:

Places
Brüggen, Germany, municipality in the district of Viersen, Germany
RAF Bruggen, former Royal Air Force Station
Brüggen (Leine), German municipality
Brüggen Glacier, glacier in southern Chile

People
Frans Brüggen, Dutch conductor
Juan Brüggen Messtorff, (1887–1953), German-Chilean geologist